Eduardus Johannes Cornelis Gerardus van den Oord (born 19 April 1963) is a Dutch psychiatric geneticist. He is Professor and Director of the Center for Biomarker Research and Personalized Medicine at Virginia Commonwealth University in Richmond, Virginia, United States.

References

External links
Faculty page

Living people
Dutch geneticists
Psychiatric geneticists
Dutch emigrants to the United States
Virginia Commonwealth University faculty
Erasmus University Rotterdam alumni
People from Oegstgeest
21st-century Dutch scientists
20th-century Dutch scientists
1963 births